USS Crook County (LST-611), originally USS LST-611, was a United States Navy  built during World War II and in commission from 1944 to 1956. Named after Crook County, Oregon, and Crook County, Wyoming, she has been the only U.S. Navy vessel to bear the name.

LST-611 was laid down on 17 December 1943 at Seneca, Illinois, by the Chicago Bridge and Iron Company.  She was launched on 28 April 1944, sponsored by Mrs. Ray Hines, and commissioned on 15 May 1944.

Service history
During World War II, LST-611 was assigned to the Pacific Theater of Operations and participated in the Leyte landing in October 1944 and the Mindoro landing in December 1944.

LST-611 operated with the Amphibious Force, United States Pacific Fleet, following World War II and participated in the Inchon landings in September 1950 during the Korean War.

On 1 July 1955, LST-611 was renamed USS Crook County (LST-611). On 26 October 1956 she was placed in service, in reserve, in caretaker status.

Honors and awards
LST-611 earned two battle stars for World War II service and three battle stars for Korean War service.

References

 
 

LST-542-class tank landing ships
World War II amphibious warfare vessels of the United States
Cold War amphibious warfare vessels of the United States
Korean War amphibious warfare vessels of the United States
Ships built in Seneca, Illinois
Crook County, Oregon
Crook County, Wyoming
1944 ships